Alon Cohen (born November 25, 1974), known professionally by his stage name Alon De Loco, is an Israeli singer, rapper and record producer. De Loco is one of the leading artists of the Israeli reggaeton.

Personal life 
Cohen was born in Beersheba, Israel, to a family of Mizrahi Jewish (Iraqi-Jewish and Moroccan-Jewish) descent. He is married with 4 children. Cohen, his wife, and his child were living in poverty when he began his musical career, and he later said that he entered music to ensure a better life and future for himself and his family.

Career 
In 2005 he released his debut album Party Material, the album is one of the first Israeli reggaeton albums and includes the single "Halayla Ze Hazman" featuring Gad Elbaz. 2 years later he released his second album "Does Da Party".

In 2007 he wrote to Sarit Hadad her song "Hamesiba" from her album "Ze Sheshomer Alay".

In 2011, he appeared in the reality series Living in La La Land and won it.

In 2013 he released "Loco Wine" featuring Static, Omri 69 Segal, Boomerang, and his daughter Or Cohen, which got many praises. the song entered to his hits collection "De Loco Collection".
He also performs with Gad Elbaz on his L'Chaim album singing the song True Love.

Discography
2005: Party Material
2007: Does Da Party
2010: Shi Vol. 1
2013: De Loco Collection

References

External links
Official website

Israeli rappers
1974 births
Jewish Israeli singers
Jewish rappers
Living people
Israeli Mizrahi Jews
Jewish hip hop record producers
Musicians from Beersheba
Israeli people of Moroccan-Jewish descent
Israeli people of Iraqi-Jewish descent
21st-century Israeli singers
Israeli hip hop record producers
Israeli hip hop musicians
Reggaeton musicians